Aydos Temirgaliuly Tattybayev (Aidos Temırğaliūly Tättıbaev; born 26 April 1990) is a Kazakhstani professional footballer who plays for FC Shakhter Karagandy.

International career
He made his debut for the Kazakhstan national football team on 4 September 2021 in a World Cup qualifier against Finland, a 0–1 away loss. He substituted Vladislav Vasilyev in the 63rd minute.

References

External links
 
 

1990 births
People from Karaganda Region
Living people
Kazakhstani footballers
Kazakhstan international footballers
Association football forwards
FC Shakhter Karagandy players
FC Bolat players
FC Taraz players
FC Caspiy players
Kazakhstan Premier League players
Kazakhstan First Division players